Kylee Shook (born March 18, 1998) is an American professional basketball player for the New York Liberty of the Women's National Basketball Association (WNBA). She played college basketball for the Louisville Cardinals.

College career
Shook played college basketball for the Louisville Cardinals from 2016 to 2020, in her freshman season, she averaged  5.2 points, 3.3 rebounds and 0.5 assists per game. In her Sophomore season, she averaged  4.9 points, 3.6 rebounds and 0.5 assists per game. In her Junior year, she averaged  7.1 points, 6 rebounds and 0.7 assists per game. In her Senior year, she averaged 10.1 points, 8.1 rebounds and 1 assist per game. Shook finished her Louisville career as the program's all-time leader in blocked shot with 223. She was named the ACC Defensive Player of the Year, and also earned All-ACC First Team and All-ACC Defensive Team honors.

Professional career
On April 17, 2020, the New York Liberty selected Shook as the 13th pick in the 2020 WNBA Draft.

WNBA career statistics

Regular season

|-
| align="left" | 2020
| align="left" | New York
| 20 || 0 || 14.5 || .405 || .176 || .824 || 2.8 || 0.6 || 0.4 || 0.5 || 1.0 || 4.1
|-
| align="left" | 2021
| align="left" | New York
| 30 || 19 || 18.9 || .467 || .393 || .800 || 4.0 || 1.4 || 0.3 || 0.5 || 1.3 || 5.7
|-
| align="left" | Career
| align="left" | 2 years, 1 team
| 50 || 19 || 17.1 || .446 || .346 || .818 || 3.5 || 1.0 || 0.3 || 0.5 || 1.2 || 5.0

Personal life
Shook is the daughter of Kristine and US Army veteran Gerald Shook, and also has a brother.

References

1998 births
Living people
American women's basketball players
Basketball players from Colorado
Louisville Cardinals women's basketball players
McDonald's High School All-Americans
New York Liberty draft picks
New York Liberty players
Olympiacos Women's Basketball players
People from El Paso County, Colorado
Power forwards (basketball)